

541001–541100 

|-bgcolor=#f2f2f2
| colspan=4 align=center | 
|}

541101–541200 

|-id=132
| 541132 Leleākūhonua ||  || Leleākūhonua is a life form mentioned in the Hawaiian creation chant, the Kumulipo. The name compares the orbit to the flight of migratory birds and evokes a yearning to be near Earth. Me he manu i ke ala pō`aiapuni lā, he pa`a mau nō ia i ka hui me kona pūnana i kumu mai ai. || 
|-id=200
| 541200 Komjádibéla ||  || Béla Komjádi (1892–1933) was a Hungarian water polo player and coach. || 
|}

541201–541300 

|-bgcolor=#f2f2f2
| colspan=4 align=center | 
|}

541301–541400 

|-bgcolor=#f2f2f2
| colspan=4 align=center | 
|}

541401–541500 

|-id=487
| 541487 Silviapablo ||  || Silvia (born 2006) and Pablo (born 2010) are the children of the Spanish amateur astronomer Juanjo Gonzalez. || 
|}

541501–541600 

|-id=550
| 541550 Schickbéla ||  || Béla Schick (1877–1967) was a Hungarian-born American pediatrician, known for his Schick test he developed in 1913 || 
|-id=565
| 541565 Gucklerkároly ||  ||  (1858–1923) was a Hungarian forester, best-known for the reforestation of the Hármashatár hill in Budapest city, Hungary. || 
|-id=571
| 541571 Schulekfrigyes ||  || Frigyes Schulek (1841–1919) was a Hungarian architect, full professor at the Technical University of Budapest, and a member of the Hungarian Academy of Sciences. || 
|-id=582
| 541582 Tóthimre ||  || Imre Tóth (born 1957) is a Hungarian astronomer and planetary scientist, known for his research on the coma and nucleus of comets using observations made by the Hubble telescope. || 
|-id=587
| 541587 Paparó ||  || Margit Paparó (born 1950), a Hungarian astronomer and a observer of pulsating variable stars. She has also discovered supernova SN 1976C. || 
|}

541601–541700 

|-id=618
| 541618 Magyaribéla ||  || Béla Magyari (1949–2018) was a Hungarian pilot, aeronautical engineer,  colonel in the Hungarian Air Force, member of the Hungarian Astronomical Association, president of the Hungarian Astronautical Society, and a backup cosmonaut of the Soyuz 36 mission, who also worked for the Hungarian Space Office. || 
|-id=627
| 541627 Halmospál ||  || Paul Halmos (1916–2006) was a Hungarian-American mathematician. || 
|-id=691
| 541691 Ranschburg ||  ||  (1935–2011) was a Hungarian psychologist, writer, and science popularizer. || 
|}

541701–541800 

|-id=776
| 541776 Oláhkatalin ||  || Katalin Oláh (born 1948),0 a Hungarian astronomer at the Konkoly Observatory. Her research includes binary stars, as wells as the spots, the differential rotation, and the cycling activity of stars. || 
|}

541801–541900 

|-id=842
| 541842 Amygreaves ||  || Amy Greaves (born 2003), the granddaughter of British amateur astronomer Norman Falla, who discovered this minor planet. || 
|-id=878
| 541878 Jessicatallulah ||  || Jessica Tallulah Jane Forward (born 2005), the granddaughter of British amateur astronomer Norman Falla, who discovered this minor planet. || 
|-id=897
| 541897 TRAPPIST || 2012 CK || TRAPPIST (Transiting Planets and Planetesimals Small Telescopes) are two 0.6-meter robotic telescopes located at the La Silla Observatory in Chile and at the Oukaïmeden Observatory in Morocco used for  searching for comets and exoplanets. || 
|}

541901–542000 

|-id=982
| 541982 Grendel ||  || Lajos Grendel (1948–2018) was a Slovakian-Hungarian writer and university teacher. || 
|-id=983
| 541983 Matthiaspenselin ||  || Matthias Penselin (born 1963) is a German science teacher and astronomer. || 
|-id=992
| 541992 Lukácsbéla ||  || Béla Lukács (born 1947) is a Hungarian theoretical physicist. || 
|}

References 

541001-542000